Bozjani (also Romanized as Bozjānī; also known as Bozhgānī) is a village in Sang Bast Rural District, in the Central District of Fariman County, Razavi Khorasan Province, Iran. At the 2006 census, its population was 533, in 142 families.

References 

Populated places in Fariman County